Dare (released as Dare! in the United States) is the third studio album by English synth-pop band The Human League, first released in the United Kingdom in October 1981 then subsequently in the US in mid-1982. The album was recorded between March and September 1981 following the departure of founding members Martyn Ware and Ian Craig Marsh, and saw the band shift direction from their previous avant-garde electronic style toward a more pop-friendly, commercial sound led by frontman Philip Oakey.

Dare became critically acclaimed and has proved to be a genre-defining album, whose influence can be felt in many areas of pop music. The album and its four singles were large successes, particularly "Don't You Want Me". The album reached number one on the UK Albums Chart and has been certified triple platinum by the British Phonographic Industry (BPI).

A remix album based on Dare, named Love and Dancing, was released in 1982.

History

In January 1981, the Human League consisted of Oakey and Philip Adrian Wright with newly recruited teenage dancers/backing vocalists Joanne Catherall and Susan Ann Sulley. After the acrimonious split of the original band in October 1980 and the subsequent recruitment of Sulley and Catherall, the new band had only just survived a European tour by bringing in session keyboardist Ian Burden to temporarily assist. The band were deeply in debt and only barely commercially viable. Under pressure to produce results from Virgin Records, original members Oakey and Wright returned to Monumental Studios in Sheffield to start recording demo tracks. They recorded the track "Boys and Girls" from the 1980 tour, which Virgin then quickly released as a single. The style of "Boys and Girls" was more reminiscent of the band's earlier work. Sulley and Catherall, who were busy with school, appeared on the cover of the single but did not perform on the track itself. The synthesiser work was basic as Oakey and Wright admitted they lacked the skill of former members Marsh and Ware.  When "Boys and Girls" peaked at number 47 on the UK Singles Chart, Oakey realised that he would need to bring in experienced personnel to take the band in the more pop and commercial sounding direction he wanted.

Oakey's first move was to invite guitarist and keyboard player Ian Burden from their 1980 tour back to join the band full-time. As a trained musician, not only were Burden's keyboard skills vastly superior to Oakey and Wright's but he instantly proved to be an adept songwriter as well. Virgin had suggested that Oakey needed professional production and paired him with veteran producer Martin Rushent, an expert on emerging music technologies of the time. Rushent would move the band to his Genetic Sound Studios in Reading both due to the "unhealthy" atmosphere at Monumental Studios in Sheffield caused by the Human League sharing it with Heaven 17, and that Rushent's studios were better-equipped for the type of music the band was making. A downside would be that the distance would cause problems for Sulley and Catherall who were taking their final school exams at the time and had to be bussed down from Sheffield regularly.

The first result of their recording sessions was released in April 1981 entitled "The Sound of the Crowd". The final addition to the band would be Jo Callis, the former guitarist and songwriter of punk rock band the Rezillos, who quickly had to learn to play synthesisers.

The first release from the now complete new team came in July 1981, "Love Action (I Believe in Love)", which peaked at number three in the UK. The band now had much new material to work with and set about arranging it into a viable album. By September 1981 the prototype album was ready to go and provisionally entitled Dare, after a Vogue magazine cover (U.K., April 1979, Gia Carangi). Oakey explained the story behind the album name at the time:

To prepare for the album's release (set for the end of October 1981), "Open Your Heart" was released - it went to number six in the UK. It was accompanied by a high-end promotional video. When the album was released, it was condemned by the Musicians' Union, who believed the new technology employed by the Human League was making traditional musicians redundant among other concerns; they would begin a "Keep It Live" campaign believing that bands like the Human League would be able to perform concerts at the touch of a button.

Virgin executive Simon Draper's next choice would be the track "Don't You Want Me", the duet that Oakey had recorded with teenage backing singer Susanne Sulley. Oakey was unhappy with the decision and originally fought it, believing it to be the weakest track on Dare; for that reason, it had been relegated to the last track on the B-side of the vinyl album. Oakey was eventually overruled by Virgin. It would go on to become the band's greatest ever hit, selling millions of copies worldwide and becoming the 25th highest ever selling single in the UK (as of 2007). It was also the Christmas number one for 1981.

Release
The album was a massive commercial success, reaching number one on the UK Albums Chart in its second week of release. The album's release was expected to be the climax of an enormously successful year for the band, but Virgin Record's Simon Draper decided he wanted an additional single from the album before the end of the year. By Christmas 1981, Dare had gone platinum in the UK, and the Human League had a number-one album and number-one single concurrently on the UK charts.  Dare would eventually remain on the UK Albums Chart for 71 weeks. A remix album, called Love and Dancing, was released in July 1982.

International releases
The single "Don't You Want Me" had been released with an expensive and elaborate promotional video created by film maker Steve Barron. Music video was a relatively new phenomenon and cable TV station MTV had only just started up to capitalise on this new media but had very little material to work with.  Virgin Records syndicated the video to MTV which was played around the clock. Because of the interest the video generated in "Don't You Want Me", Virgin licensed the release in the US of the single and the album. The licensee for the US was A&M Records who renamed the album Dare!  The addition of the exclamation mark was because A&M wanted to differentiate their (US) release from Virgin's original release in the UK.  The release of Dare! immediately mirrored the success of the UK; and in mid 1982 it reached number three on the US Billboard 200 and the single "Don't You Want Me" was at number one on the Billboard Hot 100. Although critics were not as universally applauding as in the UK, the commercial success of Dare! would set the scene for the band's return to the US charts a number of times in later years.

Dare earned considerable income for record labels Virgin and A&M; in Virgin's case, it gave the label the first chart-topping album since Mike Oldfield's Tubular Bells in 1973. "Don't You Want Me" was the label's first ever chart-topping single. The success of Dare was responsible for saving the label from impending bankruptcy. A very grateful Richard Branson sent Philip Oakey a motorcycle as a thank you present, but Oakey had to return it as he couldn't ride it.

As well as the commercial success in the US under A&M, in 1982 Dare was also highly successful in Australia, Japan, France and Germany. Dare has been re-released a number of times since its original creation.  The 1997 U.S. CD release on Caroline Records included the additional B-side tracks "Hard Times" and "Non-Stop".  In 2002 (UK)/2003 (U.S.), another re-release combined Dare and Love and Dancing on one CD.  In 2012, a 2-CD box set compiled Dare, several bonus remixes and an expanded version of the Fascination! EP, which was released separately in Japan in 2015.

Packaging

The cover art and other album artwork is based on a concept that Oakey wanted, that the album should look like an issue of Vogue. The final design is a joint effort between Philip Adrian Wright (also the band's director of visuals) and graphic designer Ken Ansell. Its typography closely resembles the cover of Vogue April 1979 issue, which inspired the album's title. Oakey is solo on the front cover with Sulley and Catherall on the internal gatefold, Wright on the back cover, and Callis and Burden on the inner sleeve. The artwork has been reproduced in numerous forms for the various re-releases and sold as posters.

Explaining why the band's portraits are close cropped and the girls had their hair tied back for their photographs, Susan Ann Sulley explains, "we wanted people to still be able to buy the album in five years, we thought that hair styles would be the first thing to date. We had no idea people would still be buying it 25 years later."

Critical reception
Dare was almost universally critically acclaimed in the UK. In Melody Maker Steve Sutherland celebrated the fact the album would irritate guitar-rock traditionalists, saying, "All let's-pretend-pompous it's cornily consistent, cultured, crude, elegant, cheap... anything you want it to be. Me? I think it's a masterpiece. Sure to upset some, sell to millions more and so it should the way it tramps all over rock traditions. A trite sound, a retarded glam image and a mock respect. All the appeal in the world... Dare should show up the pathetic farce of pop mythology once and for all." Smash Hits critic David Hepworth called it "chock-full of precise, memorable melodies delivered with style and humour". Noted music critic Paul Morley wrote in the NME, "Dare is the second intoxicating intervention to be produced out of the great split [referring to Ian Craig Marsh and Martyn Ware leaving the first incarnation of the Human League, and their album Penthouse and Pavement released with their new band Heaven 17], and already it's the first Human League greatest hits collection... Much more than ABBA or whoever you like, the Human League signify that deliciously serious, sincerely disposable MOR music can possess style, quality and sophistication... I think that Dare is one of the GREAT popular music LPs."

In the US, Rolling Stone rated Dare four out of five stars, with reviewer David Fricke commending the Human League for finding "an appealing balance between modern technique and tuneful charm" on an album of "artfully grabby" songs. Robert Christgau of The Village Voice was less impressed, giving it a "B−" grade and remarking that "Philip Oakey comes on like three kinds of pompous jerk."

According to the book Let It Blurt: The Life and Times of Lester Bangs, renowned music critic Lester Bangs died of an accidental drug overdose while listening to Dare.

Awards
Dare featured in numerous year-end polls for 1981. It was ranked the sixth best album of 1981 by the NME, and was voted Album of the Year in the 1981 Smash Hits readers' poll. Martin Rushent received the Brit Award for Best British Producer at the 1982 ceremony for his production on Dare, while the band won the award for Best British Newcomer.

Legacy

Dare has appeared on several lists of the greatest albums of all time. Sounds magazine ranked it the 81st best album of all time in 1986, and the 44th best album of the 1980s three years later. In 1990, Dare was listed by Rolling Stone as the 78th best album of the previous decade. Q placed the record at number 69 on its 2000 list of the "100 Greatest British Albums Ever"; the same magazine, in 2006, ranked Dare the 19th best album of the 1980s. In 2006, British Hit Singles & Albums and NME organised a poll in which 40,000 people worldwide voted for the 100 best albums ever, with Dare placing at number 77. Slant Magazine listed it in 2012 as the 86th best album of the 1980s. In 2013, NME ranked the record 111th on its list of "The 500 Greatest Albums of All Time". Meanwhile, Uncut ranked Dare 132nd on its list of the 200 greatest albums of all time in 2015. Paste placed Dare at number 34 on its 2016 list of the best new wave albums.

The album was also included in the 2018 edition of Robert Dimery's book 1001 Albums You Must Hear Before You Die. Based on Dares appearances in professional rankings and listings, the aggregate website Acclaimed Music lists it as the most acclaimed album of 1981, the 36th most acclaimed album of the 1980s and the 270th most acclaimed album in history.

25th anniversary

To celebrate the 25th anniversary of the release of Dare (and the 30th anniversary of the formation of the band), the modern-day Human League (Oakey, Sulley and Catherall from the original 1981 band line up) conducted a special Dare 2007 tour of the UK and Europe playing the original album live in full during November and December 2007. An updated version of the album's cover artwork, now with recent photographs of Sulley, Oakey and Catherall in the style of the original artwork, accompanied the advertising for the tour.

Martin Rushent, interviewed in the July 2010 issue of Sound on Sound magazine, said he was working on a remastered 30th anniversary edition of the album which would include new mixes of its tracks using real instruments rather than synthesisers. However, Rushent died in June 2011 with the project unreleased.

Virgin40
Dare was one of the Virgin Records albums selected for special picture disc release to mark the 40th anniversary of the group's erstwhile record label.

Track listing

 Track 11 was the B-side of the "Love Action (I Believe in Love)" single. Track 12 was the B-side of the "Open Your Heart" single.

 For the second CD, see Fascination!.

Personnel 
Credits are adapted from the album's liner notes.

The Human League
 Ian Burden – synthesizers
 Jo Callis – synthesizers
 Joanne Catherall – vocals
 Philip Oakey – vocals, synthesizers, cover design
 Susan Ann Sulley – vocals
 Philip Adrian Wright – slides, occasional synthesizer, cover design

Additional personnel
 Martin Rushent – programming
 Dave Allen – assistant programming and engineering
 Ken Ansell – cover layout and coordination
 Brian Aris – photography

Studio equipment used 
The following studio equipment was used in the recording of the album:
 Casio M10
 Casio VL-1
 Korg 770
 Korg Delta
 Linn LM-1
 Roland Jupiter-4
 Roland MC-8 
 Roland System 700
 Yamaha CS-15

Charts

Weekly charts

Year-end charts

Certifications

References

Bibliography

External links
 

1981 albums
A&M Records albums
Albums produced by Martin Rushent
The Human League albums
Virgin Records albums